Marbury is an unincorporated community and census-designated place in Autauga County, Alabama, United States. As of the 2010 census, its population was 1,418.

Geography
Marbury is located at  (32.701241, -86.471088). It lies 522 feet (159 m) above sea level.

Demographics

Education
Marbury is served by the Autauga County School System. Marbury High School was located in Marbury, Alabama, although it was turned into a junior high for the 2010-2011 school year. A new Marbury High School has been built just south of Marbury in Deatsville.
The new MHS has top-of-the-line technology including laptops and smartboards in every room.

Marbury in movies
Tim Burton shot a scene in his movie Big Fish at a church in Marbury. The scene is when the main characters father is being buried..

Notable people 
 Dewayne White, who played seven seasons in the NFL from 2003 to 2009.

References

Census-designated places in Autauga County, Alabama
Census-designated places in Alabama